Thomas Coffin Amory Jr. (October 6, 1812 – August 20, 1889) was born in Boston, Massachusetts, the youngest son of Jonathan Amory and his wife Mehitable (Sullivan) Culter.  An American lawyer, historian, politician, biographer, and poet, he graduated from Harvard University in 1830. He became a member of the bar of Suffolk County, Boston in 1834. He served in the legislature of Massachusetts and in the municipal government of Boston.

In 1858 he published "Life of James Sullivan," former governor of Massachusetts and his grandfather. He later published extensively on the American Revolution as well as on various others of his ancestors, including Major-General John Sullivan and Sir Isaac Coffin. He also wrote numerous poems, the best known of which, "William Blaxton, Sole Inhabitant of Boston" was written at a time when the Old South Church of Boston was threatened with demolition. The poem is said to have contributed to saving the church. In 1858, Amory was elected a member of the American Antiquarian Society. In 1863, Armory served as the Chairman of the Boston Board of Aldermen.

Amory died August 20, 1889.

See also
Amory-Ticknor House

Works
Biographies
The Life of James Sullivan: With Selections from his Writings. 1859
 The Military Services and Public Life of Major-General John Sullivan of the American Revolutionary Army. 1868
 Old Cambridge and New. 1871
 Our English Ancestors. 1872
 General Sullivan not a pensioner of Luzerne. 1875
 Transfer of Erin: or The Acquisition of Ireland by England. 1877
 Memoir of John Wingate Thornton. 1879
 Memoir of Hon. Richard Sullivan. 1885
 The Life of Admiral Sir Isaac Coffin, baronet, his English and American ancestors. 1886
 Class Memoir of George Washington Warren, with English and American Ancestry. 1886
 William Blaxton.1886

Poetry
 William Blackstone, Boston's First Inhabitant 1877
 Charles River: A Poem 1888
 Siege of Newport. 1888

References

Elkins, James R. Strangers to Us All: Lawyers and Poetry Thomas Coffin Amory College of Law, West Virginia University 2001 Retrieved June 22, 2019
Warner, Charles Dudley, Hamilton Wright Mabie, Lucia Isabella Gilbert Runkle, George Henry Warner, and E. C. Towne. Library of the World's Best Literature, Ancient and Modern. Vol. XXIX New York: R.S. Peale and J.A. Hill, 1896. (p. 17) googlebooks Retrieved September 7, 2009
William Richard Cutter; William Frederick Adams Genealogical and personal memoirs relating to the families of the state of Massachusetts. Vol. 1 (pp. 210–11) New York, Lewis historical Pub. Co., 1910. googlebooks Retrieved September 7, 2009

1812 births
1889 deaths
Poets from Massachusetts
Writers from Boston
19th-century American poets
American male poets
Members of the American Antiquarian Society
19th-century American male writers
Harvard University alumni
19th-century American lawyers